"Who's Gonna Love You" is a song co-written and recorded by Canadian country artist Tebey. The song was co-written with Ryan Lafferty. It was the second single from Tebey's second extended play Love a Girl, and his first #1 hit on the Billboard Canada Country chart.

Background
Tebey described the song as "an ode to all the amazing, patient women who put up with men". The lyrics in the chorus "Who’s gonna love you if I don't?" are the man describing how the woman jokingly asks him that question in a playful manner.

Critical reception
Front Porch Music said the song has "a sultry sound and is really great to listen to". Complete Country said the song gives off "summer love vibes".

Commercial performance
"Who's Gonna Love You" reached a peak of #1 on the Billboard Canada Country chart for the week of November 24, 2018, marking his first Number One hit. It was certified Gold by Music Canada.

Music video
The official music video for "Who's Gonna Love You" was directed by Emma Higgins and premiered on July 28, 2018.

Charts

Certifications

References

2018 songs
2018 singles
Tebey songs
Songs written by Tebey 
Warner Music Group singles
Song recordings produced by Danick Dupelle